Below is a list of soundtracks (OSTs) from the anime series derived from the Oh My Goddess! (Ah! My Goddess!, ああっ女神さまっ - Aa! Megami-sama!) manga.

Oh My Goddess! (manga)

Image Album - Music and Short Story

Goddess Family Club

A Goddess's Feelings (Megami no Kimochi)

Call Me Goddess! (Megami-sama to Oyobi!)

The Law of Love (Koi no Housoku)

20-second Commercial Collection (20 Byou CM Gouka 10 Hontate)

A Goddess Sings (Megami ha Utau)

I Can't Leave Him Alone (Hottokenai no Sa)

You Can't Catch Me (Tsukamara nai Yo)

I Can't Leave Him Alone (Hottokenai no Sa) - Claim Taishougaihen Version

Happiness Accelerates (Shiawase ga Kasoku Suru) - Live Version

Ah! My Goddess!☆Singles (Aa! Megami-sama!☆Singles)

King of Extra Gifts (Tokuten-ou)

God's Present (Kami-sama no Okurimono)

Your Birthday (Anata no Birthday)

Fortune Smiled on You

Bicycle (Jitensha)

I Can't Change It, I Can't Be Transmitted (Kimi wo Kaerarenai Boku ga Tsutawaranai)

God's Karaoke (Kami no Karaoke)

God's Present Plus (Kami-sama no Okurimono Plus)

Singles Plus

King of Extra Gifts Plus (Tokuten-ou Plus)

OVA Soundtrack Plus (Ongakuhen Plus)

Oh My Goddess! (OVA)

I Can't Confess My Heart, I Wanna Confirm Your Heart (My Heart Iidasenai, Your Heart Tashikametai)
I Can't Confess My Heart, I Wanna Confirm Your Heart is the intro theme for the OVA series. One verse is borrowed from the American Civil War tune Aura Lea.
Congratulations! is the outro theme for the OVA series.

OVA Original Soundtrack 1

OVA Original Soundtrack 2

The Adventures of Mini-Goddess

Call Me Darling (Denwa Shite Daarin)
Call Me Darling by Yuki Ishii is the outro theme for the mini series. (eps 1-24)

XXX (Kiss Kiss Kiss) 
 XXX (Kiss Kiss Kiss) by SPLASH is the outro theme for the mini series. (eps 25-48)
 All tracks on the album had English titles while the songs themselves are in Japanese.

Mini-Goddess Original Soundtrack 1

Mini-Goddess Original Soundtrack 2

100 Short Sayings!

Big Concert (Ôkkina Ensôkai)

Ah! My Goddess The Movie

Try to Wish ~What You Need~ (Try to Wish ~Kimi ni Hitsuyou na Mono~)
Try to Wish ~What You Need~ by Saori Nishihata is the outro theme for the Movie.

Ah! My Goddess The Movie - Original Soundtrack

Ah! My Goddess TV Series

Open Your Mind ~Spreading Little Wings~ (Open Your Mind ~Chiisana Hane Hirogete~)
Open Your Mind ~Spreading Little Wings~ by Yoko Ishida is the intro theme for the first season of the TV series. (eps 1-26)
Wish is the outro theme for the first season of the TV series. (eps 1-12, special episode, 24)

Wing
Wing by Yoko Takahashi is the outro theme for the first season of the TV series. (eps 13–23, 25-26)

TV Series Original Soundtrack 1

TV Series Original Soundtrack 2

Variety Album 1

Variety Album 2

Variety Album 3

Ah! My Goddess: Everyone Has Wings

The Color of Joy (Shiawase no Iro)
The Color of Joy by Yoko Ishida is the intro theme for the second season of the TV series (ああっ女神さまっ それぞれの翼 - 'Aa! Megami-sama! Sorezore no Tsubasa').
Our Miracle is the outro theme for the second season of the TV series. (eps 1-11)

As Lovers (Koibito Doushi)
As Lovers by Jyukai is the outro theme for "Everyone Has Wings" series. (eps 12-24)

Everyone Has Wings Original Soundtrack

Drama CD 1

Drama CD 2

Ah! My Goddess: Fighting Wings

Star of Love (Ai no Hoshi)
Star of Love by Jyukai is the intro theme for the Ah! My Goddess: Fighting Wings.
Farewell Gift Melody is the outro theme for the Ah! My Goddess: Fighting Wings

References

Soundtracks
Discographies of Japanese artists
Film and television discographies
NBCUniversal Entertainment Japan soundtracks
Anime soundtracks
Lists of soundtracks